Inwangsan is a mountain with a height of 338 meters, located in Jongno-gu and Hongje-dong, Seodaemun-gu, central areas of Seoul, South Korea. The name literally means "mountain of generous king" in Korean. The mountain covers an area of 1,086,696.50 m2 and has many huge granite peaks which distinguish it from other mountains in Seoul. Each rock is named after its characteristic form, such as gicha bawi (기차바위, train rock), chima bawi (치마바위 skirt rock), iseul bawi (이슬바위 dew rock), moja bawi (모자바위 hat rock), and jiryungii bawi (지렁이바위 worm rock).

Inwangsan is famous for its view, so many painters depicted the mountain in their works such as Jeong Seon's Inwang jesaekdo. The Fortress Wall of Seoul surrounds the mountain in which Inwangsa temple and Guksadang shrine are located as well. Access to certain parts of the mountain, including the peak are limited during certain days and times due to the location of a military installation spanning different parts of the mountain.

History 
During the reign of King Sukjong of Goryeo, there was a palace in Nam-gyeong, the capital of the south, and it was recorded as Myeongak. Later in the Joseon Dynasty, the mountain was called " Baekaksan Mountain, " as there was a shrine dedicated to the mountain god. Since then, it has been called the Bukaksan Mountain because it is located in the north among the mountains surrounding Seoul. The mountain facing the south was called Namsan. The height of the mountain is 342 meters, and it is gently flat to the south, and has a triangular raised shape that looks better than the surrounding mountains. After the collapse of Goryeo and the establishment of Joseon Dynasty, King Taejo Lee Seong-gye established the palace as a royal palace, and it was honored as a royal palace. When the Joseon Dynasty was founded, a shrine to honor the mountain god was created at the Sanjeong Department. South Korea at the Gyeongbok Palace, below the mountain in 1394 (Taejo of four years), fortification and gyeongmudae, the president's office (景武臺) in here, too. (靑瓦臺) Cheong Wa Dae, currently president of the office is located below the mountain.

Gallery

See also
 Inwang jesaekdo
 List of mountains in Korea
 List of mountains in Seoul

References

External links

 Inwangsan : Official Seoul City Tourism(English)
  Introduction of Inwangsan
  Travel to Inwangsan

Jongno District
Seodaemun District
Mountains of Seoul
Tourist attractions in Seoul